The Louis Cabot House is a historic house on Windmill Hill Road in Dublin, New Hampshire.  Built in 1887, it is a distinctive local example of Shingle style architecture, and was the centerpiece of the large country estate of industrialist Louis Cabot.  The house was listed on the National Register of Historic Places in 1983.

Description and history
The Louis Cabot House is located in a rural setting southeast of the center of Dublin, atop a knoll on the northeast side of Windmill Hill Road southeast of Pierce Road.  It has a -story main block, to which a substantial -story wing is attached at an angle.  The primary facade is oriented facing south, with views toward Mount Monadnock.  It is fronted by a shed-roof porch, and has a large gabled dormer projecting from the roof face.  That gable and the main block end gables feature eyebrow-like projections.  The main entrance is on the west side, sheltered by a portico with an arched valance.

In 1886, Louis Cabot, a businessman from Brookline, Massachusetts whose family manufactured Cabot Stain, purchased two farms in this area. The property also included a period barn that was one of the largest ever built in Dublin. The house was probably designed by Cabot's cousin, Edward Clarke Cabot, and is one of Dublin's major examples of the Shingle Style. The estate was sold off in pieces by the family after Cabot's death in 1912.

See also
National Register of Historic Places listings in Cheshire County, New Hampshire

References

Houses on the National Register of Historic Places in New Hampshire
Shingle Style architecture in New Hampshire
Houses completed in 1887
Houses in Dublin, New Hampshire
National Register of Historic Places in Dublin, New Hampshire